Wilson Scheidemantel (born 29 October 1949) is a Brazilian sports shooter. He competed in two events at the 1992 Summer Olympics.

References

External links
 

1949 births
Living people
Brazilian male sport shooters
Olympic shooters of Brazil
Shooters at the 1992 Summer Olympics
Sportspeople from Santa Catarina (state)
Pan American Games medalists in shooting
Pan American Games bronze medalists for Brazil
Shooters at the 1983 Pan American Games
Shooters at the 1991 Pan American Games
Medalists at the 1991 Pan American Games
20th-century Brazilian people
21st-century Brazilian people